The Ministry of the Interior and Decentralization is the national Ministry of the Interior of Mauritania. Its headquarters are located in Nouakchott, just south of the Presidential Palace, between the Chamber of Commerce and the College of Science and Technology.

See also
Decentralization

References

External links
 Official Ministry website

Nouakchott
Government of Mauritania
Decentralization